Esra Pul is a Turkish freestyle wrestler competing in the 55 kg division. She is a member of Enkaspor.

Career 
In 2021, she won the bronze medal in the women's 55 kg event at the 2021 European U23 Wrestling Championship held in Skopje, North Macedonia.

In 2022, she competed at the Yasar Dogu Tournament held in Istanbul, Turkey.

References

External links 
 

Living people
Turkish female sport wrestlers
Year of birth missing (living people)
21st-century Turkish sportswomen